Xiuyan Manchu Autonomous County (Möllendorff: siuyan manju beye dasangga siyan) is a county in the southeast of Liaoning province, People's Republic of China, and is also one of the 11 Manchu autonomous counties and one of 117 autonomous counties nationally.

Administrative divisions
There are 20 towns and three townships under the county's administration.

Towns:

Townships:
Hongqiyingzi Township
Linggou Township
Shaozihe Township

Geography and climate
Xiuyan borders Yingkou and Gaizhou to the west, Donggang and Zhuanghe to the south and Haicheng and Liaoyang to the north.

Xiuyan has a monsoon-influenced humid continental climate (Köppen Dwa) characterised by hot, humid summers, due to the monsoon, and rather long, cold, and very dry winters, due to the Siberian anticyclone. The four seasons here are distinctive. A majority of the annual rainfall occurs in July and August. Due to the mountainous location, temperatures tend to be slightly cooler than areas to the south and west, and summer rainfall is more generous.

References

External links
Official website of Xiuyan County government

Manchu autonomous counties
County-level divisions of Liaoning
Anshan